Mahmoud Abdel Salam Omar is an Egyptian businessman.  He is the Chairman of El-Mex Salines, an Egyptian salt production company, and was formerly Chairman of Egypt's Bank of Alexandria and head of the Egyptian Banks Federation.  In May 2011, he was arrested on charges of sexually assaulting a maid in his room at New York City's Pierre Hotel.

Personal life and banking career
Omar is married, and has four children.

Omar was Chairman of the Bank of Alexandria, one of Egypt's largest banks.  He is also a former head of the Egyptian Banks Federation, and of the Egyptian American Bank.  He is currently the Chairman of El-Mex Salines, an Egyptian salt production company, at which he has worked since 2009.

Sexual assault charges
A 44-year-old maid at the Pierre Hotel on New York City's Upper East Side told authorities that on May 29, 2011, Omar called for room service, asking for a box of tissues to be delivered to his $900-a-night room. She said that when she delivered the tissues to his room, Omar locked his door, grabbed her in a bear hug, and began groping her breasts and kissing her on her neck and lips, squeezed her buttocks, and ground his crotch against her leg.  She said that Omar only let her leave after she agreed to give him her phone number, and that she gave him a false one.  Police said the maid reported the incident to her supervisor immediately, but that the supervisor told her to report the incident to a hotel security official the following day, and consequently the police weren't notified until the following day.  A police spokesman said that detectives found the maid to be credible.

Omar was arrested on May 30, 2011.  He was charged with two counts of sexual assault, consisting of sex abuse and forcible touching.  He appeared in Manhattan Criminal Court, and was released from Rikers Island on June 3, 2011, after posting $25,000 cash bail and surrendering his passport as he awaits trial.  Omar was scheduled to return to court on August 23, 2011.  His lawyer said he denies the charges. The maid sued him for $5 million, and Salam Omar pleaded guilty to the charges, admitting he kissed the maid and touched her breath. In June 2011, he had done 5 days of community service in a soup kitchen, and was promised his case would be closed if he stayed out of trouble for a year.

See also 

 New York v. Strauss-Kahn

References

1930s births
Living people
Egyptian businesspeople
Egyptian bankers